Crystal Valley is a residential neighborhood located in Columbus, Georgia. It is located in the eastern section of the city.

Columbus metropolitan area, Georgia
Neighborhoods in Columbus, Georgia